The 2006 edition of the Paris–Nice bicycle race was run from March 5 to March 12. The race was won by United States rider Floyd Landis, of Team Phonak.

Stages

05-03-2006: Issy-les-Moulineaux – Issy-les-Moulineaux, 4.8 km. (Prologue, ITT) 

The prologue stage saw 2005 GC winner Bobby Julich retain the yellow/white GC leader's jersey after defeating Kazakh Andrey Kaschechkin, who held the best time through most of the stage's duration, by a narrow margin of 1 second.
As the winner of the first stage he also received the green/white points jersey.
The blue jersey for best young rider went to Alberto Contador.

06-03-2006: Villemandeur – Saint-Amand-Montrond, 193 km. (Stage 1) 

By winning the peloton sprint in Saint-Amand-Montrond ahead of Allan Davis, Tom Boonen (who finished fifth in the prologue stage five seconds down on Bobby Julich) took over the yellow/white jersey due to the time bonus awarded to stage winners.
He also took over first place in the points classification.

After a short solo breakaway effort by David Zabriskie, Frenchmen Cristophe Laurent and Stéphane Augé launched a long attack at the 60-km point but were caught by the chasing peloton only 2 km before the finish line. Augé was awarded the first red polka dotted jersey in the mountains classification.

07-03-2006: Cerilly – Belleville, 200 km. (Stage 2) 

Stage 2 saw a repeat of Tom Boonen's victory over Allan Davis in the first stage, the Belgian finishing first in another bunch sprint.

The polka-dotted mountains jersey changed hands due to a long breakaway by French rider Nicolas Crosbie, who established a maximum lead of 27'30" after 81 kilometers. Crosbie was caught by the peloton 10 km before the finish line.

The blue jersey for the best young rider was awarded to Benoît Vaugrenard who took over first place with former leader Alberto Contador finishing 1'13 behind the pack.

08-03-2006: Julienas – Saint-Étienne, 168.5 km. (Stage 3) 
In the third stage to Saint-Étienne, where Kazakh racer Andrei Kivilev died after a fall in the 2003 edition of Paris–Nice (prompting the UCI to make the wearing of helmets mandatory during all UCI-sanctioned races), there were some changes to the race classifications as American Floyd Landis took over first place in the GC, placing second in the stage after Patxi Xabier Vila Errandonea.

Nicolas Crosbie and Tom Boonen retained their respective climber and sprinter jerseys, whereas the blue jersey for the best young rider was awarded to Stefan Schumacher who finished 1'25 behind the winner.

As expected of a hilly stage Stage 3 saw breakaway attempts on the different climbs, the defining break happening on the last climb of the day, the Col de la Croix de Chaubouret.

09-03-2006: Saint-Étienne – Rasteau, 193 km. (Stage 4)

10-03-2006: Avignon – Digne-les-Bains, 201.5 km. (Stage 5)

11-03-2006: Digne-les-Bains – Cannes, 179 km. (Stage 6)

12-03-2005: Nice – Nice, 135 km. (Stage 7)

General Standings

KOM Classification

Points Classification

Best Young Rider

Best Team

References
Race website
cyclingnews

Paris–Nice
Paris-Nice
Paris-Nice
Paris-Nice